Mitreola is the name of two genera of organisms and may refer to:

Mitreola (gastropod), a genus of molluscs in the family Volutidae
Mitreola (plant), a genus of molluscs in the family Loganiaceae